Barbro Marie Susanne Lorentzon-Borg (born 11 June 1961) is a Swedish former track and field athlete who specialised in the high jump.

She was born in Västerås to Inga-Britt Lorentzon (a 1960 Olympian for Sweden in the high jump) and Inge Lorentzon, a national men's sprint champion. Susanne followed in her mother's footsteps while her sister, Annika, took up sprinting like her father. She made her international debut at the 1977 European Athletics Junior Championships, coming 13th overall. Still a teenager, she matched the achievements of her mother by winning the Swedish high jump title in 1979 and was then selected to compete for her country at the 1980 Summer Olympics.

Lorentzon was a finalist at the European Athletics Indoor Championships in 1982 and 1983 and placed twelfth at the 1982 European Athletics Championships. She was chosen as Sweden's representative at the inaugural 1983 World Championships in Athletics, but again failed to make a global final. She was dominant nationally, however, winning all indoor and outdoor titles between 1981 and 1986 (bar the 1982 indoor title).

The peak of her career was the 1985 season. She also placed fourth at the 1985 European Athletics Indoor Championships – her highest finish at that competition. She jumped for Sweden at European level indoors and out in the 1986 season, but did not reach the same heights. Her last individual international medal came at the Nordic Indoor Athletics Championships that year, jumping  for the gold ahead of Finland's Niina Vihanto.

International competitions

National titles
Swedish Athletics Championships
High jump: 1979, 1981, 1982, 1983, 1984, 1985, 1986
Swedish Indoor Championships
High jump: 1981, 1983, 1984, 1985, 1986

Competing as a guest, she was also the 1980 and 1984 winner at the Finnish Indoor Championships, and the 1981 winner at the Norwegian Indoor Championships.

See also
List of high jump national champions (women)

References

External links

Living people
1961 births
Sportspeople from Västerås
Swedish female high jumpers
Olympic athletes of Sweden
Athletes (track and field) at the 1980 Summer Olympics
World Athletics Championships athletes for Sweden
World Athletics Indoor Championships medalists